Peter Vere-Jones  (21 October 1939 – 26 January 2021) was an English-born-New Zealand actor. He was known for his collaborations with director Peter Jackson, appearing in four of his films. He was also known for starring in the New Zealand television series Shortland Street.

Personal life
Vere-Jones was born in Cheshire, England, on 21 October 1939, the son of Isabel (née Wyllie) and Noel Vere-Jones, a biochemist and chemical engineer. The family emigrated to New Zealand in 1949, settling in the Wellington area.

Vere-Jones lived with his wife Sue and his two children, Benjamin and Emma. In 1989, he was diagnosed with bowel cancer, which was documented in a television documentary called Crisis: One Man's Fight. He later made a full recovery. He died in Waikanae on 26 January 2021.

Honours 
In the 2002 Queen's Birthday and Golden Jubilee Honours, Vere-Jones was appointed an Officer of the New Zealand Order of Merit, for services to writing and acting.

Filmography

References

External links 
 

1939 births
2021 deaths
21st-century New Zealand male actors
People from Paekākāriki
New Zealand male film actors
New Zealand male television actors
People from Cheshire (before 1974)
English emigrants to New Zealand